Waly Coulibaly (born February 10, 1988) is a Malian basketball player who last played for The Patterson School after previously playing for Stade Malien of the Malian Basketball League while in High School.  He is also a member of the Mali national basketball team.

Coulibaly has starred for Mali since breaking onto the international scene as a 16-year-old.  Coulibaly was the leading scorer at the along with Serge Ibaka at the 2006 FIBA Africa U-18 Championships, averaging 18.6 PPG.  He scored a team-leading 26 points in a semifinal victory against Angola that earned Mali a berth at the FIBA Under-19 World Championship 2007.  Although Mali struggled to a 15th-place finish in this tournament after being placed in a group with the gold medal winning host country Serbia, eventual silver medalist United States, and China, Coulibaly was the tournament's fourth leading scorer with 19.6 PPG.

Coulibaly played in the 2007 FIBA Africa Championship as a 19-year-old, but saw little action for the team.  Two years later, however, Coulibaly had a breakout performance at the 2009 FIBA Africa Championship for quarterfinalist Mali, averaging 14.6 PPG on a Mali team that came within one point of advancing to the semifinals after losing 74-73 to Tunisia.

References

External links
Chaminade Silverswords bio

1988 births
Living people
Chaminade Silverswords men's basketball players
Malian men's basketball players
Shooting guards
21st-century Malian people